Jari Juhani Lähde (born 8 February 1963) is a Finnish former racing cyclist. He won the Finnish national road race title in 1988. He also competed at the 1988 Summer Olympics.

References

External links
 

1963 births
Living people
Finnish male cyclists
People from Nokia, Finland
Olympic cyclists of Finland
Cyclists at the 1988 Summer Olympics
Sportspeople from Pirkanmaa